Polutele Tu'ihalamaka (born 10 September 1949) is a former Tongan rugby union footballer and a current coach.

He played for Tonga for 14 years, from 1972 to 1987, including an historical win over Australia, in 1973. He played at the 1987 Rugby World Cup.

He took office as coach of Tonga, in January 1999, and led the team to the 1999 Rugby World Cup finals, where they were eliminated in the 1st round.

External links
Profile of Polutele Tu'ihalamaka

1949 births
Living people
Tongan rugby union players
Tongan rugby union coaches
Tonga international rugby union players
Rugby union locks
Tonga national rugby union team coaches